The  2015 Rally Finland (65th Neste Oil Rally Finland) was the eighth round of the 2015 World Rally Championship season, the top international rallying competition. It was held around Jyväskylä, Finland from 30 July to 2 August 2015.  Jari-Matti Latvala won the rally, his third victory in his home country of Finland.

Entry list

Overall standings

Special stages

Power Stage

References

65. Neste Oil Rally Finland 2015: Event stats, EWRC Results

Finland
Rally Finland
Rally